Carl Birdsong (born January 1, 1959 in Kaufman, Texas) is a former National Football League punter from (1981-1985) for the St. Louis Cardinals.

Birdsong attended Crockett Junior High School in Amarillo, Texas.  Birdsong graduated from Amarillo High School and then attended West Texas State University before transferring to, and graduating from, Southwestern Oklahoma State University. Birdsong made the Pro Bowl in 1983, but for an elite punter his professional career was short – by 1986, Birdsong was out of the NFL.

Personal life
Married to Shylan Birdsong, Carl Birdsong is the father of Shylana and Orry Birdsong.

He graduated from Southwestern Oklahoma State with honors from its School of Pharmacy.  Upon completing his college degree he became a pharmacist with Maxor National Pharmacy Services Corporation in Amarillo, and currently serves as the company's President and Chief Compliance Officer.

References

1959 births
Living people
Amarillo High School alumni
American football punters
American pharmacists
National Conference Pro Bowl players
People from Kaufman, Texas
Players of American football from Texas
St. Louis Cardinals (football) players
Southwestern Oklahoma State Bulldogs football players